German Standard German, Standard German of Germany, or High German of Germany is the variety of Standard German that is written and spoken in Germany. It is the variety of German most commonly taught to foreigners.
It is not uniform, which means it has considerable regional variation. Anthony Fox asserts that British English is more standardized than German Standard German.

References

Bibliography

 
 
 
 
 

National varieties of German
Articles containing video clips